Paolo Marinou-Blanco is a film director and screenwriter.

Biography
Born in New York City, Paolo was raised in several countries, from Latin America to Europe. He studied Philosophy and History at the London School of Economics, and French Literature at University College London. He was accepted to New York University’s Tisch School of the Arts, to pursue a Master’s degree (MFA) in Film Directing and Screenwriting. During the 3-year program at NYU, Paolo wrote and directed two short films and one documentary, completed a cinematography course at F.A.M.U. (Czech Republic), and was director of photography on 5 short films and one feature documentary.

After a directing internship with Spike Lee on Sucker Free City , Paolo worked extensively throughout Europe, the US and Brazil, and then began work on “Goodnight Irene”, his first feature film, which had its theatrical release in 2008. Paolo then directed another feature film for television, "O Dez", aired on RTP1 in March 2010.
In 2011, "Brass Monkey," a screenplay Paolo wrote based on a story by Nicolai Fuglsig,  was sold to Paramount Pictures.

External links 
 

Alumni of the London School of Economics
Living people
American people of Greek descent
American people of Portuguese descent
Alumni of University College London
Tisch School of the Arts alumni
Alumni of the European Schools
Year of birth missing (living people)